The Miss Mundo Dominicana 2007 pageant was held on July 14, 2007. Only 24 candidates competed for the national crown. The chosen winner represented the Dominican Republic at the Miss World 2007. They selected 2 delegates would be elected from each regions. Then they chose a delegate from each region and would get sashed with the name of the region and automatically would be in the Final 6. The first runner up represented the Dominican Republic in Miss América Latina 2008.

Results

Miss Mundo Dominicana 2007 : Ada Aimee de la Cruz González (San Cristóbal)
1st Runner Up  : Esther Tejeda (Barahona)
2nd Runner Up : Carolyn Aquino (Samaná)
3rd Runner Up  : Yisney Lagrange (Santo Domingo)
4th Runner Up  : Smaylin Almonte (Santiago)

Top 12

Sally García (El Seibo)
Carol Fuente (Puerto Plata)
Elecia Mateo (La Romana)
Llena Bencosme (Com. Dom. Miami)
Susie Alfonseca (Pedernales)
Lussy Mejía (Com. Dom. Lto. America)
Katherine Ceballos (Monseñor Nouel)

Special awards
 Miss Photogenic (voted by press reporters) - Arlette Rodríguez (Santiago Rodríguez)
 Miss Congeniality (voted by contestants) - Seily Then (La Altagracia)
 Best Face - Lucia Collado (Distrito Nacional)
 Best Provincial Costume - Elizabeth Espinal (Com. Dom. Rhode Island)
 Best Hair - Alma Ruiz (Independencia)
 Miss Elegancia – Andrea Suarez (Salcedo)
 Miss Talented - Yiney Langrage (Santo Domingo)
 Miss Sport - Esther Tejeda (Barahona)
 Miss Beach - Ada de la Cruz (San Cristóbal)

Miss Dominican Regions

 Miss Region del Cibao Occidental : Smaylin Almonte (Santiago)
Miss Region del Cibao Oriental : Carolyn Aquino (Samaná)
Miss Region del El Valle de Enriquillo : Esther Tejeda (Barahona)
Miss Region del Exterior : Llena Bencosme (Com. Dom. Miami)
Miss Region del Higüamo : Sally García (El Seibo)
Miss Region del Ozama : Ada de la Cruz (San Cristóbal)

Delegates

Trivia

Miss Santo Domingo entered in Reina Nacional de Belleza Miss República Dominicana 2007.
Miss Distrito Nacional, Miss Independencia, Miss Pedernales and Miss San Cristóbal entered in Miss Dominican Republic Universe 2007
Miss San José de Ocoa entered in Miss Dominican Republic Universe 2006
Miss Samaná entered in Miss Dominican Republic Universe 2004

Miss Dominican Republic
2007 beauty pageants
2007 in the Dominican Republic